Anerveen is a hamlet in the Dutch province of Overijssel. It is located in the municipality Hardenberg, about 7 km north of the centre of Hardenberg.

It was first mentioned in 1846 as Anerveen, and means "bog near Ane". In 1840, it was home to 222 people.

References 

Populated places in Overijssel
Hardenberg